Daniel Carroll Brent (1770 - January 31, 1841) was an American politician and diplomat. He was acting United States Secretary of State for a three-day period from March 4 to March 7, 1825 due to the transition of John Quincy Adams from Secretary of State to President. He served as Chief Clerk for the United States Department of State, succeeding John Graham on September 22, 1817, and remained in that position until August 22, 1833, serving under presidents James Monroe, John Quincy Adams and Andrew Jackson. After leaving the position, he served as U.S. Consul to Paris until his death in 1841.

Brent was born in Stafford County, Virginia and died in Paris, France.

References
Daniel Carroll Brent at the Office of the Historian

External links

1770 births
1841 deaths
19th-century American diplomats
People from Stafford County, Virginia
Chief Clerks of the United States Department of State
Acting United States Secretaries of State